Myka Meier (born 27 June 1982) is an American-British entrepreneur, etiquette coach, and author. She is the founder of Beaumont Etiquette and co-founder of the Plaza Hotel's Finishing Program. Meier has authored two books, Modern Etiquette Made Easy: A Five-Step Method to Mastering Etiquette and Business Etiquette Made Easy: The Essential Guide to Professional Success.

Biography 
Myka Meier was born on 27 June 1982 in Sarasota, Florida. She grew up in a middle class family. She has a bachelor's degree from the University of Florida. She began taking etiquette courses after working abroad in communications. She mentored under a former member of the royal household of Elizabeth II. She went on to train in Continental European, British, and American etiquette at the Institut Villa Pierrefeu, a finishing school in Glion, Switzerland.

In 2014 Meier founded Beaumont Etiquette, a consultancy firm based in New York. She is the co-founder of the Plaza Hotel's Finishing Program, which is held at the hotel. She teaches The Duchess Effect, an etiquette class inspired by the manners of Catherine, Duchess of Cambridge and Meghan, Duchess of Sussex. Her classes involve dining etiquette, hostessing, business etiquette, and royal protocol.

In 2020, Meier's first book Modern Etiquette Made Easy: A Five-Step Method to Mastering Etiquette sold out worldwide twenty-four hours after being released on January 21, 2020. Her second book, Business Etiquette Made Easy: The Essential Guide to Professional Success, is set to be released on May 5, 2020. She was named an official partner of Downton Abbey: The Exhibition in America.

She has been called "America's Queen of Good Manners" and "America's First Lady of Manners" by The Times, and "The Marie-Kondo of Etiquette" by The Evening Standard. She has been featured in Vogue, Town & Country, Harper's Bazaar, Elle Decor, InStyle, People, Fast Company, and Brides. She has also made appearances on Good Morning America and The Today Show.

Myka coined the royal etiquette term "The Duchess Slant", now an internationally recognized term for how a royal sits.

Meier is a dual citizen of the United States and the United Kingdom. Her husband, Marco Meier, is Swiss businessman. They have one daughter, Valentina, and one son, Maximillan,  and live in New York City.

Myka is the godmother of Christopher Woolf Mapelli Mozzi, the son of Dara Huang and Count Edoardo Mapelli Mozzi and stepson of Princess Beatrice of York.

References 

Living people
1982 births
21st-century American non-fiction writers
21st-century British non-fiction writers
American instructional writers
American self-help writers
American women non-fiction writers
British instructional writers
British women non-fiction writers
Etiquette writers
People from Sarasota, Florida
University of Florida alumni
Writers from Florida
21st-century American women writers